The 1987–88 season was Cardiff City F.C.'s 61st season in the Football League. They competed in the 24-team Division Four, then the fourth tier of English football, finishing second, winning promotion to Division Three.

Players
First team squad.

League standings

Results by round

Fixtures and results

Fourth Division

Source

Littlewoods Challenge Cup (League Cup)

FA Cup

Welsh Cup

Sherpa Van Trophy

See also

List of Cardiff City F.C. seasons

References

Bibliography

Welsh Football Data Archive

Cardiff City F.C. seasons
Cardiff City
Cardiff City